Current Lighting Solutions, LLC (formerly Current, powered by GE and GE Current, a Daintree company), trading as Current, is a company that sells energy management systems. It is headquartered in Cleveland, U.S. The company CEO is Manish Bhandari, who was previously the group president at Emerson for discrete & industrial portfolio of businesses.

History
Current was established by General Electric on October 7, 2015, as a startup subsidiary. It began with more than $1 billion of revenue with the expectation to grow the business to a $5 billion business by 2020.

On April 21, 2016, Current acquired the building automation company Daintree Networks for $77 million. The plan is to combine Daintree's open-standard wireless network with GE's open source platform Predix to offer a new energy management system to businesses.

On 6 November 2018, GE announced that it would sell Current to the US private equity firm American Industrial Partners. Under the terms of the sale, AIP will maintain use of the GE brand. The deal was concluded in April 2019.

On 20 June 2022, the company announced that it would rebrand from GE Current to Current Lighting Solutions following the acquisition of Hubbell’s Commercial & Industrial (C&I) Lighting business.

Projects 
Current announced working with seven global companies, including Hilton, Simon Properties, and the City of San Diego. The company has also partnered with other such companies as AT&T, Intel, and Qualcomm.

It also within the first 5 months secured the world's largest LED installation with JPMorgan Chase. Under the deal, Current will replace 1.4 million existing lights at 5,000 of JPMorgan Chase's bank branches with LED lighting. The replacement is expected to reduce the lighting-related energy used at these branches by 50 percent.

For the 2016 Summer Olympics in Rio de Janeiro, Current provided 200,000 energy-efficient lights at more than 40 Olympic venues (over 46 million square feet in total), reducing 50 percent of the energy costs.

References

External links 

Engineering companies of the United States
Former General Electric subsidiaries
Technology companies based in the Boston area
American companies established in 2015
2015 establishments in Massachusetts
2019 mergers and acquisitions